Ahmadulhaq Che Omar is a Singaporean goalkeeper who last played professionally for Hougang United FC.

Until the merger of his former club Woodlands Wellington FC with Hougang United in 2015, he is the record holder of being the longest serving player for the Rams.

Career

Starting in S.League
Ahmadulhaq started off his career as a youth player in Woodlands Wellington before moving up to feature in the senior team as the reserve goalkeeper in the 2005 S.League season behind Yazid Yasin. Unable to find a starting spot for himself due to Yazid's fine form, Ahmadulhaq moved to Tampines Rovers in 2007 behind Rezal Hassan.

He returned to Woodlands in the 2008 S.League season but once again had little game time as Woodlands employed the services of Yazid Yasin and veteran Rezal Hassan in 2009. Ahmadulhaq moved again in the pre-season of the 2010 S.League season, transferring over to Balestier Khalsa this time round.

In 2012, he was released by Balestier and he rejoined the Rams along with his coach, Salim Moin, and his teammates at Balestier, namely K. Sathiaraj, Shamsurin Abdul Rahman and Armanizam Dolah.

Big break with Woodlands Wellington
After spending 10 seasons with Woodlands, Ahmadulhaq finally got his big break in his 11th season with the Rams in 2012 when he was named as the first choice goalkeeper ahead of Woodlands' regular goalkeeper for the 2011 S.League season, Ang Bang Heng.

Ahmadulhaq was integral to Woodlands's first game of the 2012 campaign as his fine reflexes allowed the visitors to beat the Courts Young Lions on opening day. The Courts Young Lions were widely tipped to win the fixture but he was equal to the task of keeping everything out, frustrating them time and again.

He has also gone on to earn more plaudits as the 2012 S.League season progressed with his fine reflexes and shot stopping. Despite ending up on the losing team during the S.League match between Harimau Muda and Woodlands Wellington on 15 April 2012, Ahmadulhaq made the headlines when he made several fine saves and even stopped a penalty.

In a match against Balestier Khalsa on 20 July 2012, Ahmadulhaq made his second penalty save of the season against Paul Cunningham.

On 21 October 2012, Ahmadulhaq pulled off his third penalty save of the season against DPMM's Ivan Jerković.

Move to Hougang
After the announcement that Woodland will merge with Hougang United from 2015 season, Ahmadulhaq was one of the players from Woodlands to be transferred to Hougang, along with teammate Taufiq Ghani.

Club career statistics

All numbers encased in brackets signify substitute appearances.

References

External links

1981 births
Living people
Singaporean footballers
Tampines Rovers FC players
Balestier Khalsa FC players
Woodlands Wellington FC players
Singapore Premier League players
Association football goalkeepers
Singaporean people of Malay descent